KSBL (101.7 MHz, "K-Lite 101.7") is a commercial FM radio station licensed to Carpinteria, California, and serves the Santa Barbara and Oxnard—Ventura, California radio markets.  The station is owned by Rincon Broadcasting and broadcasts an adult contemporary radio format, switching to Christmas music for part of November and December.  Two syndicated shows are heard weekdays on KSBL: Delilah, an evening call-in and request show, and Intelligence for Your Life with John Tesh heard overnight.

KSBL has an effective radiated power (ERP) of 890 watts.  The transmitter is on West Camino Cielo in Goleta.

History
The call sign was KGFT. It was owned by religious broadcaster Edward G. Atsinger III and featuring Christian talk and teaching shows. In January 1988, Atsinger, then owner of half of newly-formed Salem Communications Corporation, sold KGFT to Great Electric Communications II Inc. for $1.45 million. 

KGFT changed its call letters to KLIT-FM on April 1, 1988, and adopted a soft adult contemporary music format.  The call sign switched again on October 16, 1989 to KSBL.

In July 1995, Great Electric Communications II Inc. sold KSBL to Criterion Media Group Inc. for $1.33 million, thus bringing the station under common ownership with KQSB and KTYD. Less than two years later, in March 1997, Criterion sold the station along with KQSB and KTYD to Jacor Communications for $13.5 million; Jacor was subsequently purchased by Clear Channel Communications.

In January 2007, Clear Channel sold its six Santa Barbara stations, including KSBL, to Rincon Broadcasting LLC for $17.3 million. Rincon, a subsidiary of Ventura-based Point Broadcasting, officially took control of the cluster on January 16.

On September 10, 2018, the Federal Communications Commission (FCC) granted KSBL a construction permit, good for three years, to start transmitting from a facility atop Santa Cruz Island with a directional 1,650-watt signal, licensed to Isla Vista, California.

References

External links
FCC History Cards for KSBL

SBL
Mainstream adult contemporary radio stations in the United States
Radio stations established in 1983
1983 establishments in California